The 2017 Yamagata Gubernatorial Election was a gubernatorial election that was called in Yamagata Prefecture for 22 January 2017. Mieko Yoshimura, governor since 2009, ran for a third term. Her Prefectural Citizen's Party alliance was supported by the Democratic Party, the Social Democratic Party, and the Communist Party. Because no other candidates entered the race, Yoshimura was declared the winner without a vote. Having similarly been declared winner by acclamation in 2013, this became only the third time in Japanese history that a governor was elected twice without holding a vote.

References 

2017 elections in Japan
2017
Politics of Yamagata Prefecture